Rosa ecae is a species of flowering plant in the family Rosaceae, native to Central Asia (except Kazakhstan), Afghanistan, Pakistan, and the western Himalayas. A shrub reaching , it is very similar to Rosa xanthina. It is a probable parent of the hybrids 'Golden Chersonese' and 'Helen Knight'.

References

ecae
Flora of Central Asia
Flora of Afghanistan
Flora of Pakistan
Flora of West Himalaya
Plants described in 1880